ANTV (abbreviation from Andalas Televisi, stylised antv, formerly spelled ANteve before 2003) is an Indonesian free-to-air television network based in South Jakarta. It is owned by Visi Media Asia, a unit of Bakrie Group.

History
PT Cakrawala Andalas Televisi, operating as ANTV was launched on 1 January 1993 as a local television station in Lampung province. In the same month it was awarded a government license for nationwide broadcasting, and moved its studio to Jakarta. The first programming it produced itself was live coverage of the general session of the People's Consultative Assembly on 1 March 1993.

On 29 September 2005, STAR TV (then-owned by Rupert Murdoch's first incarnation of News Corporation) bought a 20% stake in ANTV. Under Indonesian law, foreign companies can only have a 20% stake in local media companies. ANTV has 37 relay stations covering 155 cities across Indonesia and reaches 130 million people.

Sports programming

Between 2015 and 2022, ANTV did not air any sports programming, but retained an archive of classic sports events (primarily top-flight Indonesian soccer) it formerly aired live on their Lensa Olahraga YouTube channel, named after their former sports news program.

On July 16–17, 2022, ANTV aired a friendly match between Persija Jakarta vs RANS Nusantara F.C., marking a return of sports programming to the channel. and Persebaya vs PSIM. From September 2022, the network started airing One Pride MMA series, a local, network-owned mixed martial arts promotion, moving from tvOne.

ANTV also has shown 2022-23 Bundesliga from Saturday, February 4, 2023 with a match between Borussia Mönchengladbach against Schalke 04.

Slogans
Saat Paling Meng-asyik-kan (The Most Exciting Moment) (1993–1994)
 Makin Asyik Acaranya! (The More Fun It Is!) (1994–1996)
 Wow Keren! (Wow, It's Cool!) (1996–2003, 2011–2015)
 Makin Keren (More Cooler) (2003–2005)
 Makin Dinamis (More Dynamic) (2005–2006)
 TV Ramah Buat Keluarga (Friendly TV for the family) (2006–2010)
 Berkilau Bersama ANTV (Shining With ANTV) (2010–2011)
 ANTV Keren (ANTV It's Cool) (2015–2021)
 ANTV Lebih Berwarna (ANTV More Colorful) (2021–present)
 ANTV Rame (ANTV It's Crowded) (2022–present)

Anniversary slogans
 12 Tahun Makin Dekat Makin Memikat (More Closer, More Attractive, 2005)
 Funtast16 (2009)
 Kilau 17 (2010)
 Kilau Emas 18 (2011)
 Samudera Karya XIX (2012)
 Viva La Vida (2013)
 Gala XXI (2014)
 Indonesia Keren (Cool Indonesia, 2015, 2017–2019)
 1001 Kisah (1001 Story, 2016)
 Untukmu Indonesiaku (For You Indonesia, 2020)
 Jejak Waktu (Time Track, 2021)
 Indonesia Bangkit (Rise Indonesia, 2022)

Main directors
 Agung Laksono (1993–1998)
 Anton A. Nangoy (1998–2002)
 Anindya Bakrie (2002–2009)
 Dudi Hendrakusuma (2009–2013)
 Erick Thohir (2013–2019)
 Ahmad Zulfikar Said (2019–present)

Presenters

Current
 Novia Putipama
 Intan Saumadina
 Jaswin Kaur
 Karen Nijsen
 Crystal Oceanie
 Sesa Eryka

Former
 Elfin Pertiwi Rappa
 Hana Qosim
 Inge Dewi
 Intan Saumadina
 Limystina Novatra
 Merlyn Yuriana
 Nada Ferlysia
 Anita Firdaus
 Arief Widoseno
 Arya Ondrio
 Faizal Aprialdi
 Catherine Mulyadi
 Arif Kurniawan
 Ryan Hasri
 Rudy Fitryandanu
 Andini Effendi
 Ariana Herawati
 Dwi Anggia (now at tvOne)
 Fitri Ekawati
 Fessy Alwi
 Grace Natalie (now at Partai Solidaritas Indonesia)
 Indy Rahmawati
 Jean Girsang
 Melati Suryaningtyas
 Melisa Gandasari
 Myra Junor
 Rahma Alia (now at SEA Today)
 Maria Selena
 Tengku Fiola
 Mercy Tirayoh (now at Kompas TV)
 Tika Ghafar
 Anggunita Swastya
 Valerina Daniel (now at BTV)
 Witri Epilia
 Yasmin Muntaz (now at SEA Today)
 Emzy Ardiwinata
 Deba Depari
 Dita Fakhrana
 Intan Mariana
 Novi Herlina
 Gilbert Pangalila
 Putra Maulana
 Kartika Berliana
 Indah Setyani
 Azis Arriadh
 Restu Wulandari
 Ojip Ismaputra
 Nadia Purwoko
 Elang Purbaya
 Intan Aletrinö

Gallery

See also
 List of television stations in Indonesia

References

External links
Official website 

Television networks in Indonesia
Television channels and stations established in 1993
Mass media in Jakarta
Bakrie Group